Collie Solomon (born 23 November 1959) is a Guyanese cricketer. He played in fourteen first-class and six List A matches for Guyana from 1983 to 1988.

See also
 List of Guyanese representative cricketers

References

External links
 

1959 births
Living people
Guyanese cricketers
Guyana cricketers